The Klabona Keepers is a Canadian documentary film, directed by Tamo Campos and Jasper Snow-Rosen and released in 2022. The film is a profile of the Tahltan First Nation's successful activist campaign against industrial development that would have impacted the Sacred Headwaters, or Klabona, in northern British Columbia.

The film premiered on May 26, 2022 at the Toronto edition of the Human Rights Watch Film Festival. At the 2022 Vancouver International Film Festival, it was named the winner of the Audience Award for the Insights program.

References

External links

2022 films
2022 documentary films
Canadian documentary films
Documentary films about First Nations
Films shot in British Columbia
2020s Canadian films